The Town of Southport was a local government area in South East Queensland, Australia.

History
On 11 November 1879, the Nerang and Coomera Divisions was created as two of 74 divisions within Queensland under the Divisional Boards Act 1879.

On 6 July 1883, Southport Division was formed from part of subdivision No. 1 of Nerang Division and part of subdivision No. 1 of Coomera Division.

On 6 Feb 1889, part of Southport Division was separated to be a municipal Shire of Southport, but this shire was abolished on 30 June 1892 and the original division was restored.

With the passage of the Local Authorities Act 1902, the entire Southport Division became the Shire of Southport on 31 March 1903.

On 12 April 1918, the Shire of Southport became the Town of Southport on 12 Apr 1918.

A new town hall was in opened in 1935 and listed on the Queensland Heritage Register in 1998.

Amalgamations in 1948
On 9 December 1948, as part of a major reorganisation of local government in South East Queensland, an Order in Council replacing ten former local government areas between the City of Brisbane and the New South Wales border with only four. The former ten were:
 Beaudesert
 Beenleigh
 Cleveland
 Coolangatta
 Coomera
 Nerang
 Southport
 Tamborine
 Tingalpa
 Waterford

The four resulting local government areas were:
 Town of South Coast, an amalgamation of the Towns of Southport and Coolangatta with the Burleigh Heads part of Nerang (which later became City of Gold Coast)
 the new Shire of Albert: a merger of Beenleigh, Coomera, Nerang (except for the Burleigh Heads area), the southern part of Tingalpa and the eastern part of Waterford
 an enlarged Shire of Beaudesert, an amalgamation of Beaudesert and Tamborine with the western part of Waterford
 the new Redland Shire, an amalgamation of Cleveland and the northern part of Tingalpa (which later became Redland City)

The Order came into effect on 10 June 1949, when the first elections were held.

Chairmen and mayors
 Chairmen of the Division of Southport

 Chairmen of the Shire of Southport

 Mayors of the Town of Southport

Following Southport's change of status to a Town, Edward Hicks was elected its first mayor at a meeting on 11 May 1918. From then on, mayors were popularly elected at triennial elections.

References

Former local government areas of Queensland
1883 establishments in Australia
1949 disestablishments in Australia